The 1966 Pacific hurricane season started on May 15, 1966, and ended November 30, 1966. The season was of little note. Hurricane Blanca traveled 4,300 miles, setting a new record. During September and October of the year, Hurricane Helga and Tropical Storms Kirsten, Lorraine, and Maggie hitting Mexico. Kirsten caused 8 deaths and US$5.6 million (equivalent to $ million in ) in damages in Mexico.

Systems

Hurricane Adele

On the morning of June 20, the first tropical depression of the season formed south of Mexico. It initially went west-northwestward. On the afternoon of June 21, the depression strengthened into a tropical storm and was named Adele. It continued north until the evening of June 22, when it strengthened into a category 1 hurricane and sharply recurved west. It made landfall west of Manzanillo, Mexico on the evening of June 24 and dissipated that day. Extensive damage was caused by Adele in Mexico but no deaths were reported. Adele was the shortest lived hurricane of the season.

Tropical Depression Two

On June 28, a tropical depression formed west of Central America. It remained weak and dissipated two days later, never threatening land. Tropical Depression Two caused no reports of damages or deaths.

Tropical Depression Three

Hurricane Blanca

On the evening of August 2, a tropical storm formed south of Mexico, skipping tropical depression strength. It initially went west-northwest until the evening of August 4 when it reached category 1 hurricane status. Blanca eventually leveled off as it headed westward. On the morning of August 7, Blanca weakened into a tropical depression after weakening into a tropical storm two days later. During the afternoon of that day, Blanca crossed into the Central Pacific as a 30-mile per hour tropical depression. Blanca  regained tropical storm status on August 9 as it went northwestward. Blanca continued stair-stepping as it dissipated on August 12 while northwest of Honolulu, Hawaii. As Blanca never affected land, there were no reports of damages or deaths. Blanca set a record for the farthest traveling storm that formed in the Eastern Pacific by traveling 4,300 miles during its life. (1957's Hurricane/Typhoon Della traveled 5,000 miles, but formed in the Central Pacific.)

Hurricane Connie

On August 7, a tropical storm was identified southwest of the Baja California Peninsula and named Connie. It continued westward until three days later when Connie began to move northwest while remaining a tropical storm. During the morning of August 12, the storm crossed into the Central Pacific. The next morning, Connie was deemed to have become a hurricane with winds of 85 miles per hour. Connie was stable in intensity until the 15th when she weakened into a tropical storm while southeast of the Big Island of Hawaii. Connie dissipated while almost directly south of Kihei on Maui.
Connie caused no reported damage or deaths in Hawaii.

Tropical Depression Six

Tropical Depression Seven

Hurricane  Dolores

On August 16, a tropical storm was identified south of Manzanillo, Mexico and was named Dolores, the eight tropical depression of the season. During the afternoon of August 18, Dolores was noted to have more organization and became a hurricane. Dolores time as a hurricane was brief, Dolores weakened 24 hours after being upgraded. Dolores continued on her northwestward trek until August 23 when she became quasi-stationary and began to weaken. Dolores dissipated on August 25 while far away from land.

Tropical Depression Nine

Hurricane Eileen

On August 22, an area of low pressure gained enough organization and became Tropical Depression Ten. Two days later, the depression strengthened into a tropical storm and was named Eileen. Eileen headed northwest-ward as the slowly became stronger. On the morning of August 26, Eileen rapidly strengthened and became the seasons 5th hurricane.
Eileen stayed this was for 36 hours and her minimum pressure of 990 mbar was recorded.. Just before she recurved, she weakened into a tropical storm as she moved over cooler waters.
As she continued to recurve sharply, and on the night of August 28 (PDT time) she weakened into a remnant low. During the 26th, a ship sailed through the hurricane but there was no reported damage aboard the ship. Eileen also caused no deaths.

Hurricane Francesca

Tropical Depression Eleven formed due south of La Paz, Mexico on September 5. The next morning, the depression became the season's sixth tropical storm and was named Francesca. After this period of strengthening, Francesca leveled out and remained a hurricane until the morning of September 9 when it weakened prior to a southward dive as the result of interacting with nearby Tropical Storm Gretchen. Francesca continued to trek southward until the evening of September 11, when the storm very sharply recurved. Subsequently, Francesca weakened into a tropical depression as it went due east for 36 hours. Francesca degenerated into a remnant low on the morning of September 16. Francesca was the longest lived hurricane of the season by lasting eleven days. Wave action from Francesca and Hurricane Helga caused beach erosion throughout California.

Tropical Storm Gretchen

During the evening of September 7, a tropical disturbance that was near Hurricane Francesca became Tropical Storm Gretchen, bypassing the depression stage. Gretchen did not strengthen during her lifetime due to her proximity to Francesca and was nearly absorbed by her because Francesca disorganized Gretchen, the last advisory was issued on September 11. Because Gretchen never affected land, there was no damage or deaths reported from it.

Hurricane Helga

On the morning of September 9, a tropical wave spawned Tropical Depression Thirteen. The storm was quickly to intensify and was named six hours later. The tropical storm began to curve north and on September 12 Helga became the eighth, and last hurricane of the season. She remained at that intensity for 36 hours and then began to weaken. She had weakened into a tropical storm when she made landfall on the Baja California Peninsula and weakened into a tropical depression. The depression dissipated on the 17th while in the Mexican state of Chihuahua. 
Helga caused the death of one person in California and also caused beach erosion throughout California and the Baja California Peninsula. The combined wave action from Helga and Francesca caused extensive damage throughout the region.

Tropical Storm Ione

On September 10, Tropical Depression Fourteen formed west of Tropical Storm Helga. The depression was slow to organize and became Tropical Storm Ione during the afternoon of the 12th. Ione's time as a tropical storm was brief and the last advisory was issued the next morning due to land interaction that weakened the system. Even though Ione dissipated near Mexico, the remnant low brought rain to Mexico. No deaths or damages were reported due to Ione when she was warned upon. While she was a low, there is no information.

Tropical Depression Twenty-Two

On September 10 a tropical depression was located by the Joint Hurricane Warning Center (JHWC) and was designated Tropical Depression Twenty-two and was heading westward. During the morning of the 12th, the depression passed 240 miles south of the island of Hawaii. It dissipated that night. The depression caused heavy rainfall throughout the Hawaiian Islands during the 12th. The reason that this depression was named 22 is unknown, but it is probably because it was numbered with the Western Pacific storm numbers.

Tropical Storm Joyce

During the late evening of September 14, Tropical Depression Fifteen formed far away from land. The depression took a long time to strengthen and became a tropical storm for only 24 hours late in its life before cooler waters took hold of the system and made it a remnant low on September 20. Joyce was one of the shortest lasting storms of the season.

Tropical Storm Kirsten

Six days after Joyce dissipated, a new tropical depression formed while southwest of the Baja California Peninsula. This depression, like Joyce before it, took a long time to become named. The depression finally became named  storm on September 28 while nearing landfall. Kirsten made landfall during the late morning of September 28 on the Baja California Peninsula. She made another landfall near Los Mochis, Mexico later that day. Kirsten rapidly dissipated over land the next morning. Kirsten caused at least eight deaths in Ciudad Obregón and an estimated damage of $5.6 million (equivalent to $ million in ). Despite this, Kirsten was not retired, although the name Kirsten was not used in 1970 due to a possible misspelling. In 1970, the name Kristen was used as a "K" name instead, but in 1974, the "K" name was changed back to Kirsten.

Tropical Storm Lorraine

Near the end of the season Tropical Depression Sixteen formed while south of Mexico. The depression quickly intensified and became a tropical storm and was named Lorraine. Lorraine made landfall west of Tecoman, Mexico and quickly dissipated. Lorraine brought rain to Mexico in areas that would get rain from Tropical Storm Maggie (see below) a few days later. Lorraine caused no reports of damage or deaths in Mexico.

Tropical Storm Maggie

On October 16, Tropical Depression Eighteen formed while south of Mexico. The depression, like Joyce and Kirsten before it took a long time to become a tropical storm. Finally on October 18 the depression strengthened and became Tropical Storm Maggie, the final tropical storm of the season. Maggie brought torrential rains to areas affected by Lorraine earlier in the month as she paralleled the Mexican coast. She finally made landfall near Manzanillo, Mexico and weakened into a tropical depression while near Puerto Vallarta. The depression briefly emerged off the coast before making landfall near Puerto Vallarta for the last time. Maggie dissipated shortly afterward. Maggie caused no reports of damages or deaths.

Other system 

According to the Joint Typhoon Warning Center and Japan Meteorological Agency, on October 20 Tropical Storm Kathy crossed the International Dateline, entering into CPHC's area of responsibility; however, this storm wasn't included into CPHC database. The storm eventually became extratropical on October 21 over open waters.

ACE (Accumulated Cyclone Energy)

Storm names

No names were retired from this list, so it was reused in the 1970 season. Except for the name Kirsten, which was replaced by Kristen in that season, possibly due to a clerical error.

See also

 List of Pacific hurricanes
 1966 Atlantic hurricane season
 1966 Pacific typhoon season
 1966 North Indian Ocean cyclone season
 Australian region cyclone seasons: 1965–66 1966–67
 South Pacific cyclone seasons: 1965–66 1966–67
 South-West Indian Ocean cyclone seasons: 1965–66 1966–67

References

 
Pacific hurricane seasons
Articles which contain graphical timelines